Robert Picht (27 September 1937 in Berlin; 24 September 2008 in Hinterzarten) was a German academic.

Biography 

Son of Professor Georg Picht and his wife Edith Axenfeld, Robert Picht studied sociology and Romance studies at the universities of Munich, Frankfurt am Main, Hamburg, Paris, Madrid and Freiburg. 
In 1964 he obtained a Magister Artium degree in French literature in Hamburg. at the Sorbonne in 1972, he passed the exam to earn a Dr. phil. In 1990 he was appointed professor of sociology at the University of Hagen.

From 1965 to 1972 he served at the office of the German Academic Exchange Service (DAAD) in Paris. During this time he was also a lecturer for German language and politics at the Institut d’Etudes Politiques and Ecole Nationale d’Administration in Paris.

For 30 years, from 1972 to 2002, he took the position of director at the Franco-German Institute in Ludwigsburg. 
He also served as Vice President and Chairman of the Executive Committee of the European Cultural Foundation in Amsterdam from 1976 to 1995.

He was rector ad interim of the College of Europe from 2002 to 2003 and vice-rector of the College of Europe campus in Natolin (Warsaw) from 2004 to 2007 (ad interim 2004-2005), focusing his scholarly attention on Europe in a globalising world order.

Works 
 Kommentierte Bibliographie: Deutschland nach 1945, Bonn-Bad Godesberg, 1972
 Französische Germanistikstudenten, Bad Godesberg 1974
 Perspektiven der Frankreichkunde: Ansätze zu einer interdisziplinär orientierten Romanistik, Tübingen 1974
 Deutschlandstudien II, Bonn 1975
 Fallstudien und didaktische Versuche, Bad Godesberg, 1975
 Kulturpolitik für Europa: Planungsansätze europäischer Stiftungsarbeit, Bonn 1977
 Deutschland, Frankreich, Europa: Bilanz einer schwierigen Partnerschaft, München 1978
 Das Bündnis im Bündnis. Deutsch-französische Beziehungen im internationalen Spannungsfeld, Berlin 1982
 Deutsch-französische Beziehungen. Hagen 1984
 Die rätselhaften Deutschen. Die Bundesrepublik von außen gesehen. Mit Brigitte Sauzay, Stuttgart 1985
 Einführung in die Frankreichforschung. Hagen 1986
 Esprit/ Geist: 100 Schlüsselbegriffe für Deutsche und Franzosen mit Jaques Leenhardt, München 1989 & 1993 
 veränd. Fassung: Fremde Freunde. Deutsche und Franzosen vor dem 21. Jahrhundert (Essays zu der versch. Bedeutung von Kernbegriffen in beiden Sprachen, Titel sehr irreführend) Hg. mit Vincent Hoffmann-Martinot, René Lasserre & Peter Theiner; Piper, München 1997 & 2002 
Französ. Fassung: Mit Jacques Leenhardt Au jardin des malentendus. Le Commerce franco-allemand des idées Actes Sud, Arles 1992  & ebd. 1997 
 Motor für Europa? Deutsch-französischer Bilateralismus und europäische Integration Bonn 1990
 De Gaulle, Deutschland und Europa. Mit Wilfried Loth, Opladen 1991
 L'Identite europénne: analyses et propositions pour le renforcement d'une Europe pluraliste: une étude de la Trans European Policy Studies Association Brüssel 1994
 Deutsch-französischer Hochschulaustausch. Stand und Perspektiven Ludwigsburg 1998
 A pilot study on innovating education and learning the role of foundations and corporate funders, Brüssel 1998
 Education funding in Europe, Brüssel 1998
 Integrating youth into a changing society: the role of foundations and corporate funders, Brüssel 1999
Dieter Mahncke, Léonce Bekemans, Robert Picht, The College of Europe. Fifty years of service to Europe, College of Europe, Bruges, 1999. 
 Generation Erasmus. Zum Europabild junger Europäer, in: Merkur (Zeitschrift) Jg. 58, Bd. 4, 2004, S. 306

References

Academic staff of the University of Hagen
Rectors of the College of Europe
Academic staff of the College of Europe
German expatriates in Belgium
Officers Crosses of the Order of Merit of the Federal Republic of Germany
1937 births
2008 deaths